Hypsopygia albidalis is a species of snout moth in the genus Hypsopygia. It was described by Francis Walker in 1866 and is known from Australia (including New South Wales and Queensland).

References

Moths described in 1866
Pyralini